Arthur Taxier (born January 19, 1951) is an American character actor, best known for the role of Lieutenant Carl Zymak in the TV series Midnight Caller. He also played the recurring role of Dr. Morton Chegley in the TV series St. Elsewhere, between 1983 and 1988. He played William Weiderman in the Tales from the Darkside episode Sorry, Right Number (1987), written by Stephen King.

References

External links
Arthur Taxier at Yahoo! Movies

1951 births
Living people
American male television actors
Male actors from Glasgow
Scottish emigrants to the United States